Hypomelus is a genus of beetles of the family Tenebrionidae. It is the type genus of the Hypomelina subtribe.

Selected species
There are about 15 species:
 Hypomelus basalis Haag-Rutenberg JG, 1871
 Hypomelus flagrans Péringuey LA, 1899
 Hypomelus interstitialis Haag-Rutenberg, JG 1871
 Hypomelus obliquatus Solier AJJ, 1843
 Hypomelus obliteratus Solier AJJ, 1843
 Hypomelus osbecki (Billberg, 1815)
 Hypomelus peringueyi Gebien H, 1910
 Hypomelus peronatus Germar EF, 1824
 Hypomelus procerut
 Hypomelus reflexicollis Haag-Rutenberg JG, 1871
 Hypomelus reflexus Haag-Rutenberg JG, 1871
 Hypomelus servus Péringuey LA, 1899
 Hypomelus setosocostatus Haag-Rutenberg JG, 1871
 Hypomelus villosocostatus Solier AJJ, 1843
 Hypomelus vulpinus Haag-Rutenberg JG, 1873

References

Pimeliinae
Tenebrionidae genera